Toni Demuro (Sassari, 19 March 1974) is an Italian illustrator.

Biography
In 1997 he graduated in painting at the Academy of Fine Arts in Sassari and since then has worked as a creative in the field of visual arts and design.

In 1996 he won the "Acquaviva nei Fumetti" award.

He has collaborated with The Washington Post, Penguin Books, The Boston Globe, Atlanta Magazine, Rádio Londres Editora, Sarbacane, Éditions Héloïse d'Ormesson, Sellerio, Mondadori, Corriere della Sera, Vanity Fair, TukMusic.

In 2014 he created the cover of the album "Jazzy Christmas" by the musician Paolo Fresu.

In 2017 he produced the covers of three books by Roald Dahl, "The Wonderful Story of Henry Sugar and Six More", "The Great Automatic Grammatizator" and "Skin and Other Stories" published by Penguin Books

Works

Album

Works originally published in French
 2019, Savane, haïkus pour les enfants, Editions Un Chat la nuit
 2019, Chaumièr, Editions La Palissade
 2018, Des ours dans la maison, Editions D'Orbestier
 2018, Quand je marche dans le désert, Editions Les Minots
 2017, La coccinelle – Haïkus pour les enfants, Editions Sarbacane
 2016, Quand je marche en forêt, Editions Les Minots
 2015, L'oiseau qui avait avalé une étoile, La Palissade
 2015, Le Bidule, Editions D'orbestier
 2014, Célestin rêve, Editions D'orbestier
 2013, La Cheneuille, Editions D'orbestier

Awards
 2017, Prix Michel Tournier jeunesse
 2017, Prix Atout lire
 2017, Sélectionné Prix du livre Versailles jeunesse 
 2017, Sélectionné Prix des incorruptibles
 2016, Prix Jeunesse de la Ville du Touquet-Paris-Plage
 2016, Prix Gayant Lecture
 1996, Premio "Acquaviva sui fumetti”

References

External links

Living people
Italian illustrators
Year of birth missing (living people)